Hartford Public Schools may refer to:

 Hartford Public Schools (Connecticut) in Hartford, Connecticut
 Hartford Public Schools (Michigan) in Van Buren County, Michigan